Taubaté Prison is a prison in Taubaté in São Paulo, Brazil. It is notorious for containing some of the most violent prisoners, for repeated prison riots, and for being the place where the Primeiro Comando da Capital criminal gang originated.

On December 19, 2000 The Prison Uprising ended at Taubaté Prison

released more than 20 hostages on Monday, ending an uprising at a maximum security facility that left nine prisoners dead, officials said.

The rebellion at the Taubate House of Custody and Psychiatric Treatment, about 80 miles outside Sao Paulo, began during visiting hours Sunday when an inmate opened fire with a revolver, provoking a fight with prisoners from another pavilion.

Taking advantage of the confusion, prisoners took 23 hostages including four children.

Inmates began releasing hostages in small groups Monday after authorities agreed to transfer 10 prisoners to another facility. The hostages, all of whom were unhurt said the prisoners treated them well during the ordeal.

The department said the nine victims were probably killed in a settling of scores between rival gangs.

References

External links 
 BBC News story: Nine die in Brazil prison riot, 19 December 2000

Prisons in Brazil
Primeiro Comando da Capital